Sheng Yuqi (born 3 January 1996) is a Chinese former professional tennis player.

On 31 December 2018, she reached her career-high singles ranking of world No. 846. On 14 May 2018, she peaked at No. 566 in the doubles rankings.

Sheng made her WTA Tour main-draw debut at the 2016 Shenzhen Open, when she partnered Li Yixuan in the doubles draw.

ITF Circuit finals

Doubles (0–6)

External links
 
 

1996 births
Living people
Chinese female tennis players
21st-century Chinese women